Andrei Gennadyevich Sidelnikov (born 8 March 1980) is a Russian-born Kazakh former professional footballer..

Career
On 29 December 2014, Sidelnikov was released by FC Aktobe.

On 24 January 2018, Sidelnikov announced his retirement from football.

Honours

Aktobe
Kazakhstan Super Cup (1): 2014

References

External links 
 

1980 births
Living people
Footballers from Moscow
Association football goalkeepers
Kazakhstani people of Russian descent
Russian footballers
Kazakhstani footballers
Kazakhstani expatriate footballers
Kazakhstan international footballers
Expatriate footballers in Belarus
Expatriate footballers in Kazakhstan
Russian Premier League players
Kazakhstan Premier League players
FC Spartak-2 Moscow players
FC Spartak Tambov players
FC Dinamo Minsk players
FC Khimki players
FC Spartak Vladikavkaz players
PFC Spartak Nalchik players
FC Aktobe players
FC Oryol players
FC Ordabasy players
FC Kairat players
FC Spartak Moscow players
FC Dynamo Makhachkala players